The Moscow Bureau for Human Rights is Russian human rights monitoring non-governmental organization, which is headed by Alexander Brod.

The Bureau publishes monitoring materials of the violation of human rights in Russia, carries out educational programs, holds press-conferences. The Bureau won a European Commission grant to conduct project Public Campaign to Combat Racism, Xenophobia, Anti-Semitism, and Ethnic Discrimination in the Multinational Russian Federation.

The Public Council of the Bureau includes Alla Gerber, Leonid Zhukhovitsky, Alexander Rekemchuk, Mark Rozovsky.

External links
Moscow Bureau for Human Rights
Moscow Bureau for Human Rights

Organizations established in 2002
2002 establishments in Russia
Organizations based in Moscow
Human rights organizations based in Russia
Civil rights organizations